Joseph or Joe Fitzpatrick may refer to:

 Joe FitzPatrick (born 1967), Scottish politician
 Joe Fitzpatrick (boxer) (born 1994), Irish boxer
 Joe Fitzpatrick (footballer) (born 1997), English footballer
 Joe Fitzpatrick (hurler) (born 1984), Irish hurler
 Joseph F. Fitzpatrick, American politician active in the 1920s
 Joseph F. Fitzpatrick Jr. (1932–2002), American carcinologist
 Joseph T. Fitzpatrick (1929–2006), American politician

See also 
 Fitzpatrick (surname)
 Fitzpatrick (disambiguation)